is a tokusatsu children's comedy show from Japan. Produced by Toho Company Ltd., the show ran for 260 episodes and aired on Fuji TV from October 1, 1973 to September 27, 1974. Kure Kure Takora—the main character of the show—wants everything he sees and says "Kure! Kure!" ("I want it! I want it!"). Each episode ran exactly 2 minutes and 41 seconds.

Episodes 223, 252, and 255 never aired. The show was eventually rebroadcast over CS digital satellite television, with the exception of episode 220, which was omitted because Takora is repeatedly referred to by his neighbors as "crazy"— which was thought to be verbally abusive towards the mentally ill — as he goes on a violent rampage with a blunt katana. Laserdisc and VHS versions of the show have been released. A complete DVD set (which included episode 220) was released in 2002 but has since gone out of print.

Staff

Creator/Planning - Osamu Isono
Writers - Shinichi Ichikawa, Hiroshi Kashiwabara, Yuko Kinoshita, Yoshimi Shinozaki, Yuji Watanabe
Directors - Katsumune Ishida, Ko Tsuboshima, Tsugunobu Otani
Music - Shunsuke Kikuchi

Voice cast

Takora, Chonbo, Monro: Yoshiko Ota
Debura, Biragon, Herara, Shikushiku, Ikary: Osamu Saka

Characters

Kure Kure Takora is a red octopus. He uses a type of ninjitsu where he can transform anything from a dopey iguana to a vacuum cleaner to a guitar. His best friend is the weak-willed peanut-inspired Chonbo. While he has friends, he seems to have no problems leaving them for dead if he has to make a fast getaway. Like all other characters in the show, Kure Kure  is in love with the fickle pink walrus Monro. His greatest fear is being soaked with vinegar and being served as sudako (pickled octopus).
Chonbo is Kure Kure Takora's best friend and toadie. He is a squash-humanoid of the genus cucurbita, who is able to cough up coins for vending machines at will. Although he is complicit in many of Kure Kure's crazy schemes, he's just as often on the receiving end of Kure Kure's abuse. Chonbo is often seen somersaulting and tumbling.
To Ro Ro is a short jellyfish who squawks like a dolphin. He is able to spray vinegar out of the top of his head via a sprinkler. Kure Kure often attempts to neutralize this super power—since Kure Kure is afraid of vinegar—by throwing hats on To Ro Ro's head. (The reason for this fear is that in Japan “tako” or octopus is often served with vinegar when prepared for eating.) To Ro Ro can turn invisible and teleport at will and is even a bigger troublemaker than Kure Kure Takora. Most of the other characters are frightened of him.
Monro is a pink walrus with a breathy voice and sexy theme music that the male characters pursue. She often demands unreasonable things from her suitors only to lose interest in them. She has been romantically involved with every creature—even the repellent sea cucumber gang—on the show.
Debura is a rotund badger who is often seen chewing on the stub of a cigar; this tough cop runs the local jail. He's the only character who wears clothes.
Biragon is a slow-witted iguana; he is extremely lazy and spends most of his time sleeping. He may be the richest character on the show as he often has a new gadget or toy that is coveted by Kure Kure.
The Sea Cucumber Gang: This trio has their own theme song which they occasionally break into. It is believed they represent anger (Ikari), happiness (Hera Hera), and sadness (Shiku Shiku). The Sea Cucumber Gang are on the very bottom of the hierarchy of the characters, and poor Shiku Shiku gets picked on the most!

Theme song

Roughly translated from Japanese, the lyrics to the show's theme song are:

Gimme! Gimme! Gimme!
I want everything
Gimme Gimme Octopus
Up from the ocean
I got hot and sunburned
Why must I live at the top of the tree
Viewing all my desires through a telescope... I want the stars!
Gimme Gimme Octopus

External links
 Video: weird vintage Japanese octopus baby nightmare (Boing Boing, March 16, 2006)
 A fan site's episodes guide (Japanese)
 A fan site with english episode guide and linked youtube episodes (English)
 Another fansite with character info (Japanese)
 Kure Kure Takora DVD-BOX (Amazon.co.jp)

1973 Japanese television series debuts
1974 Japanese television series endings
Fuji TV original programming
Japanese television shows featuring puppetry
Tokusatsu television series
Toho tokusatsu
Fictional octopuses